Aeshna athalia  is a species of dragonfly in the genus Aeshna. It is found in China.

References

Aeshnidae
Odonata of Asia
Insects described in 1930